Olive is a 1988 Australian television film about actress Olive Bodill, who died of cancer in 1985.

References

External links
Olive at Peter Malone

Olive at BFI
Olive at Screen Australia

Australian television films
1988 television films
1988 films
1980s English-language films